Summer Waves is a water park located on Jekyll Island, near the port city of Brunswick, Georgia. The park is open from May to September/October.

Attractions

External links
Summer Waves official site

References

Buildings and structures in Glynn County, Georgia
Water parks in Georgia (U.S. state)
Tourist attractions in Glynn County, Georgia
Jekyll Island